Hallam Football Club is an English football club based in Crosspool, Sheffield, South Yorkshire. Founded in 1860, Hallam is the second oldest association football club in the world. Hallam currently play in the Northern Counties East League Premier Division, at the ninth level of the English football league system.

Hallam have played at their Sandygate Road home in the Sheffield suburb of Crosspool since formation, with the ground being officially recognised by the Guinness Book of Records as "The Oldest Football Ground in the World".

In 1867, the club made history by winning the world's first ever football tournament, the Youdan Cup. The club still possesses the historic trophy. Games against local rivals Sheffield F.C., the oldest club in the world, are known as the Rules derby.

History
Although formed in 1860, the football club can trace its links even further back, to 1804, when the owner of the Plough Inn public house on Sandygate Road agreed to allow a new cricket club, Hallam CC, to start playing on an adjacent field he owned.

The club had in excess of 300 members by the 1850s, and in 1860 it decided to form a football club to oppose Sheffield F.C., formed three years earlier. On Boxing Day 1860, the two clubs played each other on Sandygate Road for the first time. The match report for the game in the Sheffield Daily Telegraph states that the game was played between 16 of Sheffield and 16 of Hallam and Stumperlowe (Stumperlowe being a hamlet half a mile from Sandygate).

The Hallam Football Club's founder and captain, John Charles Shaw, soon became President of the Sheffield Football Association which organised matches according to the locally preferred rules for its growing number of member clubs. Shaw was directly instrumental, with Charles Alcock of the London-based Football Association, in the formation of nationally accepted rules for playing the game. Shaw and Alcock were the respective captains in the first game between a Sheffield XI and a London XI, in 1871, in which the preferred rules were tried out.

In 1867, Hallam won the first ever football competition, the Youdan Cup. The trophy was subsequently misplaced by the club, and did not resurface again until 1997 when a Scottish antiques collector who had come into possession of the silver trophy sold it back to the club for £2,000. In 2014 the trophy was featured on the BBC programme Antiques Roadshow, where it was valued at £100,000. Club chairman Chris Taylor subsequently said the club had no plans to sell the trophy.

Although professionalism began to creep into the game during the 1870s and −80s, Hallam chose to remain fully amateur. In the summer of 1886, for reasons unknown but likely because of financial constraints, the club was dissolved, but a year later the club was re-formed and re-registered with the Sheffield & Hallamshire FA.

Hallam entered their first league competition in 1892 when joining the newly formed Hallamshire League, and they would also play in the Sheffield Minor Cup League, Sheffield Alliance and the Hatchard League as the 19th century came to a close. They won the Hatchard League title for the first time in 1903, and a year later won the league again, though they lost the play-off final played between the top four teams, and so surrendered their title. They also reached the final of the Sheffield and Hallamshire Senior Cup for the first time in 1904, but lost 1–6 to Barnsley reserves at Bramall Lane.

In 1911 the club first competed in a Football Association (FA) cup competition, when they entered the FA Amateur Cup. Three years later the First World War began, but Hallam continued to play, dropping out of the Hatchard League to join the Sheffield Amateur and Minor Leagues, previously staples of the club's reserve team. Eventually, in 1917, Hallam decided they could no longer keep playing, and suspended playing operations, only re-joining the Sheffield Amateur League after hostilities had ended, in 1919.

In 1925 Hallam pulled off one of their greatest ever results when they knocked out five-time Amateur Cup winners Bishop Auckland in front of over 2,000 people at Sandygate Road. Two years later the club entered the FA Cup for the first time. After winning the Sheffield Amateur League for the second time in 1927, they were admitted back into the Sheffield Association League.

At the end of the 1932–33 season the landlord of the Plough Inn public house decided to lease the Sandygate Road ground to other teams (Crookes WMC and later Fulwood) as Hallam were not providing enough bar takings. Although the club retained its affiliation with the local FA, Hallam's eviction from their ground saw them refrain from playing any football for a period of 15 years.

Hallam's return to football came about in 1947 when they finally arranged a return to Sandygate Road, playing in the Sheffield Amateur League and the re-formed Hatchard League (which they won) before finally re-joining the Sheffield Association League in 1949, winning the title for the first time. A year later Hallam won the Sheffield Senior Cup for the first time when they beat Stocksbridge Works at Hillsborough in front of 7,240 spectators, and in 1952 they entered the Yorkshire League.

That same season an Amateur Cup tie with Dulwich Hamlet was switched to Hillsborough stadium because of increased ticket demands – the attendance of over 13,000 proving to be a club record. After winning promotion to the top flight of the Yorkshire League for a second time in 1960, Hallam spent twenty years playing at the same level.

The 1982–83 season saw the demise of the old Yorkshire League, with Hallam entering the new Northern Counties East League (NCEL), which demanded more stringent ground grading rules. With only seven years of its ground lease remaining the club could not commit to expensive improvements. Protracted negotiations with the landlord eventually led to a 99 years extension being granted but a large premium was demanded within one year. A massive fund raising effort secured the new lease and continued for the provision of floodlights, first used in 1992, and a stand behind one goal to shelter 100 people.

The club has spent most of its time in the NCEL in the Premier Division (which currently sits at level 9 of the English football league system), and won the League Cup competition in 2004 when beating Mickleover Sports in the final, but in 2011 they were relegated back to the First Division.

In 2012, Sandygate Road received a much needed facelift, paid for by a posthumous donation by a lifelong supporter who had left the club a substantial amount of money in his will. In 2016 and 2017, the club qualified for the Division One end of season play-offs, but were eliminated in the semi-finals on both occasions.

The appointment of Craig Denton as manager in 2020 was followed by an upturn in results and attendances, and in the 2021-22 season Hallam secured the Division One title and promotion to the NCEL Premier Division, with Sandygate hosting record crowds in excess of 1,100.

Season-by-season record

Current squad

Notable former players
Players that have played in the Football League either before or after playing for Hallam –

  Michael Boulding
  Brian Broadhurst
  Andy Brownrigg
  Sean Connelly

  Tony Crane
  Harry Deacon
  Sean Dunphy
  David Faulkner

  Fred Furniss
  George Handley
  Brian Linighan
  Billy Mosforth

  Mick Pickering
  Mark Smith
  Chris Waddle
  Jack Whitham

Ground
Sandygate (stadium), Crosspool, Sheffield, UK, S10 5SE.

Sandygate is a football and cricket stadium in the Sheffield suburb of Crosspool, South Yorkshire, England.  It is home to Hallam F.C. and Hallam C.C.

First opened in 1804, Hallam F.C. have played at the ground since 1860.  Sandygate has been recognised by the Guinness Book of Records as the "Oldest Football Ground in the World". On 26 December 1860, the world's first inter-club football match was played at the ground, Hallam taking on Sheffield F.C.

The ground offers viewing for spectators from 3 sides of the pitch. The Shed End, the Main Stand and the Cricket Net End.

The Shed End

The Shed End is a covered terrace behind the goal on Sandygate Road. This mainly houses the vocal home supporters and is where the bulk of the atmosphere is created.

Gallery

Honours

League
 Yorkshire League Division Two
 Winners –1960–61 (champions)
 Promoted – 1956–57
 Northern Counties East League Division One
 Champions – 2021–22
 Promoted – 1993–94
 Sheffield Association League
 Champions – 1949–50
 Hatchard League
 Champions – 1902–03, 1948–49
 Sheffield Amateur League
 Champions: 1912–13, 1913–14, 1922–23, 1926–27

Cup
 Sheffield & Hallamshire Senior Cup
 Winners – 1950–51, 1961–62, 1964–65, 1967–68
 Runners-up – 1903–04, 2009–10
 Northern Counties East League Cup
 Winners – 2003–04
 Youdan Cup
 Winners – 1867

Records
 Best FA Cup performance: 3rd Qualifying Round, 1957–58
 Best FA Amateur Cup performance: Quarter-finals, 1924–25
 Best FA Trophy performance: Preliminary Round, 1974–75
 Best FA Vase performance: 5th Round, 1980–81
 Record attendance – 2,000 vs. Hendon, FA Amateur Cup, 1958–59 (at Hillsborough – 13,855 vs. Dulwich Hamlet, FA Amateur Cup, 1952–53)

References

External links
 Official website

 
Football clubs in England
Football clubs in South Yorkshire
Association football clubs established in 1860
1860 establishments in England
Sports teams and clubs in Sheffield
Sheffield & Hallamshire County FA members
Hatchard League
Sheffield Amateur League
Sheffield Association League
Yorkshire Football League
Northern Counties East Football League